The 2010 Limerick Senior Hurling Championship was the 116th staging of the Limerick Senior Hurling Championship since its establishment by the Limerick County Board.

Adare were the defending champions.

On 3 October 2010, Kilmallock won the championship after a 1-16 to 1-12 defeat of Emmets in the final. It was their ninth championship title overall and their first title since 1994.

Results

Quarter-finals

Semi-finals

Final

Championship statistics

Miscellaneous
 Kilmallock win their first title since 1994.

References

Limerick Senior Hurling Championship
Limerick Senior Hurling Championship